Stanisław Ryszard Dobrowolski (14 March 1907 in Warsaw–27 November 1985 in Warsaw) was a poet, prose writer and translator, a member of the left-wing avant-garde poetry group Kwadryga (Quadriga). Dobrowolski was a participant of the Warsaw Uprising. After the war he served as a political officer of the Polish People's Army.

Sources
Ю. Л. Булаховская. Станислав Рышард Добровольский: Жизнь и творчество / АН УССР, Ин-т лит. им. Т. Г. Шевченко, Киев. Наук. думка 1990  (Yu. L. Bulakhovskaya. Stanislav Ryshard Dobrovolsky: Life and work / Academy of Sciences of the Ukrainian SSR, Institute of Literature.. T. Shevchenko, Kiev. 1990)

1907 births
1985 deaths
Writers from Warsaw
People from Warsaw Governorate
Polish poets
Warsaw Uprising insurgents
Polish People's Army personnel
Polish United Workers' Party members
Burials at Powązki Military Cemetery
Recipients of the Order of Polonia Restituta
Recipients of the Order of the Banner of Work
Recipients of the Cross of Valour (Poland)